Rosemont, also known as Rosemont Plantation, Poplar Grove or Hale House, was built in 1814 in Woodville, Mississippi. It was listed on the National Register of Historic Places in 1974 and designated a Mississippi Landmark in 1987.

The house is the family and boyhood home of Jefferson Davis, President of the Confederate States of America 1861–1866. It is open to the public for tours.

It may be included within the Woodville Historic District.

References

External links
 Rosemont Plantation

Houses on the National Register of Historic Places in Mississippi
Houses completed in 1814
Museums in Wilkinson County, Mississippi
Historic house museums in Mississippi
Houses in Wilkinson County, Mississippi
1814 establishments in Mississippi Territory
Mississippi Landmarks
National Register of Historic Places in Wilkinson County, Mississippi